In economics, capital goods or capital are  "those durable produced goods that are in turn used as productive inputs for further production" of goods and services.  At the macroeconomic level, "the nation's capital stock includes buildings, equipment, software, and inventories during a given year."

A typical example is the machinery used in factories. Capital can be increased by the use of the factors of production, which however excludes certain durable goods like homes and personal automobiles that are not used in the production of saleable goods and services. 

Adam Smith defined capital as "that part of man's stock which he expects to afford him revenue". In economic models, capital is an input in the production function. The total physical capital at any given moment in time is referred to as the capital stock (not to be confused with the capital stock of a business entity). Capital goods, real capital, or capital assets are already-produced, durable goods or any non-financial asset that is used in production of goods or services.

In narrow and broad uses
Classical and neoclassical economics describe capital as one of the factors of production (alongside the other factors: land and labour). All other inputs to production are called intangibles in classical economics. This includes organization, entrepreneurship, knowledge, goodwill, or management (which some characterize as talent, social capital or instructional capital).

This is what makes it a factor of production:
 The good is not used up immediately in the process of production unlike raw materials or intermediate goods. (The significant exception to this is depreciation allowance, which like intermediate goods, is treated as a business expense.)
 The good can be produced or increased (in contrast to land and non-renewable resources).

These distinctions of convenience have carried over to contemporary economic theory. Adam Smith provided the further clarification that capital is a stock. As such, its value can be estimated at a point in time. By contrast, investment, as production to be added to the capital stock, is described as taking place over time ("per year"), thus a flow.

In Marxian critique of political economy, capital is viewed as a social relation, In Marx critical analysis of the economists portrayal of the capitalist mode of production as a transhistorical state of affairs, he distinguishes between different forms of capital.
 constant capital, which refers to capital goods
 variable capital, which refers to labor-inputs, where the cost is "variable" based on the amount of wages and salaries paid during an employee's contract/employment,
 fictitious capital, which refers to intangible representations or abstractions of physical capital, such as stocks, bonds and securities (or "tradable paper claims to wealth")

Earlier illustrations often described capital as physical items, such as tools, buildings, and vehicles that are used in the production process. Since at least the 1960s economists have increasingly focused on broader forms of capital. For example, investment in skills and education can be viewed as building up human capital or knowledge capital, and investments in intellectual property can be viewed as building up intellectual capital. Natural capital is the world's stock of natural resources, which includes geology, soils, air, water and all living organisms. These terms lead to certain questions and controversies discussed in those articles.

Modern types of capital 

Detailed classifications of capital that have been used in various theoretical or applied uses generally respect the following division:
 Financial capital, which represents obligations, and is liquidated as money for trade, and owned by legal entities. It is in the form of capital assets, traded in financial markets. Its market value is not based on the historical accumulation of money invested but on the perception by the market of its expected revenues and of the risk entailed.
 Social capital, which in private enterprise is partly captured as goodwill or brand value, but is a more general concept of inter-relationships between human beings having money-like value that motivates actions in a similar fashion to paid compensation.
 Instructional capital, defined originally in academia as that aspect of teaching and knowledge transfer that is not inherent in individuals or social relationships but transferable. Various theories use names like knowledge or intellectual capital to describe similar concepts but these are not strictly defined as in the academic definition and have no widely agreed accounting treatment.
 Human capital, a broad term that generally includes social, instructional and individual human talent in combination. It is used in technical economics to define "balanced growth", which is the goal of improving human capital as much as economic capital.
 Public capital is a blanket term that attempts to characterize physical capital that is considered infrastructure and which supports production in unclear or poorly accounted ways. This encompasses the aggregate body of all government-owned assets that are used to promote private industry productivity, including highways, railways, airports, water treatment facilities, telecommunications, electric grids, energy utilities, municipal buildings, public hospitals and schools, police, fire protection, courts and still others. However, it is a problematic term insofar as many of these assets can be either publicly or privately owned.
 Natural or ecological capital is the world's stock of natural resources, which includes geology, soils, air, water and all living organisms. Some natural capital assets provide people with free goods and services, often called ecosystem services. Two of these (clean water and fertile soil) underpin our economy and society and make human life possible.

Separate literatures have developed to describe both natural capital and social capital. Such terms reflect a wide consensus that nature and society both function in such a similar manner as traditional industrial infrastructural capital, that it is entirely appropriate to refer to them as different types of capital in themselves. In particular, they can be used in the production of other goods, are not used up immediately in the process of production, and can be enhanced (if not created) by human effort.

There is also a literature of intellectual capital and intellectual property law. However, this increasingly distinguishes means of capital investment, and collection of potential rewards for patent, copyright (creative or individual capital), and trademark (social trust or social capital) instruments.

Building on Marx, and on the theories of the sociologist and philosopher Pierre Bourdieu, scholars have recently argued for the significance of "culinary capital" in the arena of food.  The idea is that the production, consumption, and distribution of knowledge about food can confer power and status.

Interpretations

Within classical economics, Adam Smith (Wealth of Nations, Book II, Chapter 1) distinguished fixed capital from circulating capital. The former designated physical assets not consumed in the production of a product (e.g. machines and storage facilities), while the latter referred to physical assets consumed in the process of production (e.g. raw materials and intermediate products). For an enterprise, both were types of capital.

Economist Henry George argued that financial instruments like stocks, bonds, mortgages, promissory notes, or other certificates for transferring wealth is not really capital, because "Their economic value merely represents the power of one class to appropriate the earnings of another" and "their increase or decrease does not affect the sum of wealth in the community".

Some thinkers, such as Werner Sombart and Max Weber, locate the concept of capital as originating in double-entry bookkeeping, which is thus a foundational innovation in capitalism, Sombart writing in "Medieval and Modern Commercial Enterprise" that:
The very concept of capital is derived from this way of looking at things; one can say that capital, as a category, did not exist before double-entry bookkeeping. Capital can be defined as that amount of wealth which is used in making profits and which enters into the accounts.

Karl Marx adds a distinction that is often confused with David Ricardo's. In Marxian theory, variable capital refers to a capitalist's investment in labor-power, seen as the only source of surplus-value. It is called "variable" since the amount of value it can produce varies from the amount it consumes, i.e., it creates new value. On the other hand, constant capital refers to investment in non-human factors of production, such as plant and machinery, which Marx takes to contribute only its own replacement value to the commodities it is used to produce.

Investment or capital accumulation, in classical economic theory, is the production of increased capital. Investment requires that some goods be produced that are not immediately consumed, but instead used to produce other goods as capital goods. Investment is closely related to saving, though it is not the same. As Keynes pointed out, saving involves not spending all of one's income on current goods or services, while investment refers to spending on a specific type of goods, i.e., capital goods.

Austrian School economist Eugen Boehm von Bawerk maintained that capital intensity was measured by the roundaboutness of production processes. Since capital is defined by him as being goods of higher-order, or goods used to produce consumer goods, and derived their value from them, being future goods.

Human development theory describes human capital as being composed of distinct social, imitative and creative elements:
 Social capital is the value of network trusting relationships between individuals in an economy.
 Individual capital, which is inherent in persons, protected by societies, and trades labour for trust or money. Close parallel concepts are "talent", "ingenuity", "leadership", "trained bodies", or "innate skills" that cannot reliably be reproduced by using any combination of any of the others above. In traditional economic analysis individual capital is more usually called labour.
 Instructional capital in the academic sense is clearly separate from either individual persons or social bonds between them.
This theory is the basis of triple bottom line accounting and is further developed in ecological economics, welfare economics and the various theories of green economics. All of which use a particularly abstract notion of capital in which the requirement of capital being produced like durable goods is effectively removed.

The Cambridge capital controversy was a dispute between economists at Cambridge, Massachusetts based MIT and University of Cambridge in the UK about the measurement of capital. The Cambridge, UK economists, including Joan Robinson and Piero Sraffa claimed that there is no basis for aggregating the heterogeneous objects that constitute 'capital goods.'

Political economists Jonathan Nitzan and Shimshon Bichler have suggested that capital is not a productive entity, but solely financial and that capital values measure the relative power of owners over the broad social processes that bear on profits.

See also
 Capital deepening
 Capital (Marxism)
 Capitalist mode of production (Marxist theory)
 Das Kapital
 DIRTI 5
 Means of production
 Organic composition of capital
 Organizational capital
 The Accumulation of Capital
 Venture capital
 Wealth (economics)

References

Further reading
 
 
 Pistor, K. (2020). Code of Capital: How the Law Creates Wealth and Inequality, Princeton University,

External links

 

 
Capitalism